Catagonium serrulatum is a species of moss from the genus Catagonium. It was described by Viktor Ferdinand Brotherus in 1925, from material collected in Panama.

References

Hypnales
Plants described in 1925
Taxa named by Jules Cardot
Taxa named by Viktor Ferdinand Brotherus